Pagliacci is a 1936 British musical film directed by Karl Grune and starring Richard Tauber, Steffi Duna and Diana Napier. It is an adaptation in English of the 1892 opera Pagliacci by Ruggiero Leoncavallo.

Production
The film is shot partially in colour (using the UFAcolor process) and partially in black-and-white. The film's art direction was by Oscar Friedrich Werndorff. The film was made by the independent Trafalgar Films at Elstree Studios. The film was a very expensive production, with Tauber himself receiving £60,000 for appearing, which turned into a costly flop on its release.

Caught up in the technical procedures of the colour sequences, Grune asked Wendy Toye to direct the actors for him.

Cast
 Richard Tauber as Canio Salvatini 
 Steffi Duna as Nedda Salvatini 
 Diana Napier as Trina
 Arthur Margetson as Tonio 
 Esmond Knight as Cadet Silvio 
 Jerry Verno as Beppe, comic trouper 
 Gordon James as Leone 
 Harry Milton as Cadet 
 Ivan Wilmot as Silvio's Coach Driver 
 John Traynor as Coach-Home Builder

See also
 List of early color feature films

References

Bibliography
 Low, Rachael. Filmmaking in 1930s Britain. George Allen & Unwin, 1985.
 Wood, Linda. British Films, 1927-1939. British Film Institute, 1986.

External links

1936 films
1930s color films
1930s historical musical films
British historical musical films
1930s Italian-language films
Films directed by Karl Grune
Films based on operas
Films set in Italy
Films about clowns
Films shot at British International Pictures Studios
British black-and-white films
1930s English-language films
1930s British films